Kimon Taliadoros (born 28 March 1968) is a former Australian footballer, sports commentator and businessman.  He is President of Football Victoria.

Football career
Taliadoros played over 11 seasons in the National Soccer League for South Melbourne, Marconi, Sydney Olympic, Collingwood Warriors and Parramatta Power. He also played nine times for the Australia national team.

Taliadoros was the first life member of the Australian Professional Footballers Association (formerly the "Australian Soccer Players' Association"), being elected to the Association's executive at its formation in 1993, then serving as Chief Executive 1994–95 and President 1995–98.

Post-football career
Taliadoros focused on developing a business career upon his retirement from football in 2002. He has worked for NineMSN, Boost Juice, News.com.au, and recently Australian brokerage firm Centric Wealth.

In addition to his business activities, Taliadoros is an occasional commentator for SBS Sport and Fox Sports Australia.

References

External links 
 Aussie Footballers Tabain to Tathem

1968 births
Living people
Soccer players from Melbourne
Australian people of Greek descent
Australia international soccer players
South Melbourne FC players
Marconi Stallions FC players
Sydney Olympic FC players
Parramatta Power players
Association football commentators
Australian chief executives
Melbourne City FC non-playing staff
Collingwood Warriors S.C. players
Association football forwards
Australian soccer players